Kaziranga National Park (Assamese: কাজিৰঙা ৰাষ্ট্ৰীয় উদ্যান Kazirônga Rastriyô Uddyan) is an Indian national park and an UNESCO World Heritage Site situated in the Golaghat and Nagaon district of Assam, India. It is a tourist destination and conservation area particularly notable as a refuge for the endangered Indian one-horned rhinoceros (Rhinoceros unicornis), hosting the largest population of wild Indian one-horned Rhinoceros in the world. The park contains significant stock of three other large herbivores — the Asian Elephant, the Asiatic Water Buffalo and the eastern subspecies of the Swamp Deer. Kaziranga also has the highest density of tiger in the world and is declared a Tiger Reserve in 2006. Kaziranga is recognized as an Important Bird Area by Birdlife International for conservation of avifaunal species.

Wildlife wing of Forest department, Government of Assam is mainly responsible for the administration and management of Kaziranga. However the Ministry of Environment and Forests, Government of India manages the park in the central level along with Chief Conservator of Forests (Wildlife) in the regional level. Kaziranga National Park receives funds from Central Government and State Government under various Plan and Non-Plan Budgets. Central Government provide fund for development of infrastructure and eco-development. The park also receives fund under the Project Elephant from the Central Government. The State Government funds the park for conservation of rhinos in Assam (under R.C. Scheme), development and management of the park and control of poaching. Most of this funding is used in paying wages and salaries of the staff and in anti-poaching measures, only a little sum is left behind for the development of the park. In spite of the funding from the government the park faces shortage of fund.  The park received a total of US$100,000 in 1997 and 1998 under Technical Co-operation for Security Reinforcement scheme from the World Heritage Fund. The park also receives minor monetary help from various national and international NGOs. There is a plan to generate fund by the money received from the tourist.  Every year an Annual Plan of Operation is prepared based on which funding is done. The administrative headquarters of the park is at Bokakhat.

The park is led by a Conservator level officer as its Director. A Divisional Forest Officer is the administrative chief executive of the park. There are two Assistant Conservator of Forests and four range forest officers heading park ranges at Ghorakati (Burapahar Range), Baguri (Baguri Range), Kohora (Central Range) and Agoratoli (Eastern Range) respectively. The park is further divided into beats (headed by a forester) and sub beats (headed by forest guard) for administrative purposes.

There are three dirt tracks inside the park corresponding to the three forest ranges of the park for patrolling and to view wildlife by the tourists. The Central or Kaziranga range with Kohora as the entry point covers the Daglang and Foliomari area. Some part of this range is the Core Zone of the Tiger Reserve or a Strict Nature Reserve, where casual visitors are not permitted. The Western range has Baguri as the entry point and covers the Monabeel, Bimoli, Kanchanjuri areas. This range is preferred for seeing big game like rhinos and water buffaloes. The Eastern range with Agortoli as the entry point covers Sohola and Rangamatia.

Employment
Tourism benefits the people living in the fringe of the park and helps in empowering the local people. About 35 hotels or lodges of various kinds located just outside the park, out of these, four are run by the government.
A total of 299 local people are actively employed in these hotels. But, a very few hotels/lodges are owned by the local people. However, some families are offering home stay facilities just outside the park, so that the tourist may get a taste of the local life. People from the adjoining areas own 70 vehicles, which are allowed to be taken into the park, and most of them act as the driver cum guide. On the highway 37, which cuts across the park, 12 local community members own and run public phone booths. There are also 26 shops selling souvenirs etc. that are owned and/or managed by local community members. Many local women also regularly perform traditional dances at some of the larger hotels. Many sell locally handmade woven cloth to the tourist, which act as a money churner. There is tremendous scope for the sale of handicrafts in and around the park. Existing Self Help Groups (SHG) could very well provide a platform for such mechanisms. The Ministry of Tourism, Government of India along with the United Nations Development Programme (UNDP) are jointly supporting rural tourism in village of Durgapur, which falls in the periphery of the Kohora range of  Kaziranga along with other initiatives at 31 sites across India.

Local people do get some amount of employment from the park in the form of labour and allied activities. Labour requirements for the park include, labour for anti poaching activities and construction of bridges, culverts, etc. Approximately 100 to 200 people are hired per range for removal of Mimosa, a weed which is harmful for the herbivores. The park authorities have also hired15 local people as security guard to protect the tourist jeeps inside the park.  The park has developed a very good network of intelligence throughout the villages surrounding the park. There are key informants in every village, which reports about the movement of poachers and are monetarily compensated for information they provide to the park authorities.

Notes

Kaziranga National Park